Lola & Virginia is a Spanish-Basque animated television series that ran in 2006 until 2007 and was produced by Imira Entertainment. It lasted 26 episodes for one season.

Plot
Lola is a young girl who has a hard life taking care of her siblings and putting up with her friends. Along comes Virginia Toffen, a stuck-up, bratty, rich girl who always gets her way. They soon become enemies and begin fighting over everything.

Episodes
 The Onion Trick/Incognito
 I Saw it First/Ideal Boyfriend
 Beauty Treatment/Haunted House
 Good Food & Rock N' Roll/Planet girl
 Mayhem in the Snow/Bye, Doll
 Roller Coaster/Problem Pets
 Dream Team/Elder Brother
 Unhappy Birthday/Lola Fashion
 Magic Garden/The Secret Club
 A Moped for Two/Perfect Friendship
 Headline News/Pair of Aces
 A Shoulder to Cry on/Kinky Kindred
 Afraid of What?/Oh No, Not Her!
 Hugo in Love/Fan Club
 Blackmail/30 Minutes Flat
 On the Sidelines/I Survived 100 Days in San Lorenzo
 Good Morning San Lorenzo/Love Soap
 Frog Party/Tyrannosaurus Virginia
 Carnival/Frozen Heart
 The Olympic Torch/Teacher's Pet
 Pyjama Party/San Lorenzo vs. Columbus
 Brushstrokes/The Uniform
 Dear Diary/The Lightning Man
 21st Century Cinderella/Compulsive Buyer
 Dear Lola/A Boyfriend for Haide
 High Treason/Secret Love (final episode)

Characters
Lola (voiced by unknown) - the show's protagonist. She lives in a working-class family with one younger brother, one baby sister and her mother, and her enemy is Virginia. Her father is never shown. She mainly wears a short red buttoned dress which is identified as one of the cheapest clothes to wear in the episode "The Uniform" and she is short and stout with short black hair and also wears round purple glasses.

Virginia Toffen (voiced by unknown) - the show's antagonist, daughter of a very wealthy and successful toilet paper entrepreneur. Virginia suffers from a symptom where she thinks she is the centre of the universe, as revealed in the episode "The Uniform". Her enemy is Lola, and she is used to hanging out with a girl named Beatrice and formerly Leticia. She is a bratty rich girl who always gives her parents a hard time and usually getting what she wants. She is tall and thin with long blonde hair and is usually seen wearing a black leather coat, blue jeans and black and silver sunglasses.

Poppy (voiced by unknown) - one of Lola's best friends, she wears a pinkish-purple top with a skull on it and she is also seen together with Lola. She is a tomboy.

Haide (voiced by unknown) - another of Lola's friends, she is usually seen with Lola and helping her with problems, along with Poppy. She and Poppy are sometimes involved in trying to reveal Virginia's plans. She believes deeply in astrology and originally from Cuba.

Agi and Yukio (voiced by unknown) - the twin geniuses at San Lorenzo High. They are often seen creating robots and other gadgets. They have actually been together, even in trips to the Amazon rainforest or the Gobi desert.

Beatrice (voiced by unknown) - one of Virginia's friends, or so she thinks. She is always seen with Virginia and helping her with her plots and schemes to embarrass Lola. She is also briefly seen helping Lola (but only to get Virginia's friendship back).

Charlie (voiced by unknown) - a student from San Lorenzo High. Charley hangs out with Lucas and Chuck and loves skateboarding. Lola and Virginia have crushes on him, often fighting to get him.

Lucas (voiced by unknown) - the sneak. His closest friends are Charlie and Chuck. He was also paid by Virginia in one episode to impersonate Marco Amore and make Lola sad, but Lola found out about Virginia's scheme and got him to dress up as Marco and take Lola home, and ends with the "Marco" cake that Lola made thrown at his face.

Chuck (voiced by unknown) - one of Lola's classmates, his best friends are Charlie and Lucas. Haide used to have a crush on him and Lola used to date him, a revealed secret which nearly broke Lola and Haide's friendship. He is African-Spanish.

Suzie (voiced by unknown) - one of Lola's classmates. She is a sweet, childish girl who still plays with dolls. She has an older brother, who Lola and Virginia formerly had crushes on. She is seen hanging out with Lola and some of her other classmates.

Marco (voiced by unknown) - a boy at Lola's school. He is shy and a bit quiet. He has blond hair and wears a red shirt. He is not to be confused with Marco Amore.

Hugo (voiced by unknown) - one of the students from San Lorenzo High, Hugo is the school's most talented dancer, even being the star of one of Marco Amore's music videos. He loves food and formerly dated Virginia.

Marco Amore (voiced by unknown) - the hit singer from San Lorenzo, Marco has all of adoring fans, including Lola, Virginia and the rest of Lola's class. Lola loves him a lot, especially since she is the head of the Marco Amore fan club. His real name is John Johnson.

Leticia (voiced by unknown) - Virginia's former friend from her old private school, Columbus. Their friendship broke apart in the episode "San Lorenzo vs. Columbus", because of Virginia winning a horse race, thanks to Lola angering Virginia. Virginia later says (as recorded by Haide on Lola's video camera) that she doesn't need Leticia.

Ana (voiced by unknown) - teacher of San Lorenzo High.

Gustavo Buliavez (voiced by unknown) - the school's chef. He used to teach Lola, her friends and Marco Amore's music.

Telecast and home release
Lola & Virginia was broadcast on several European channels, including Disney Channel (Spain) & Disney Channel Italy, France 3, Pop Girl, POP!, ¡Sorpresa!, and was previously shown on Animania HD before it ceased operations in 2009. In Brazil, the show also aired on SBT. Nickelodeon South East Asia has stopped broadcasting the show, although it was one of the original channels. In the Netherlands the show aired from 2008 until 2009 on Nickelodeon. In September 2014, the series was headed to Hulu. As of 2022, the show is now streaming on Amazon Prime.

Live action

Imira Entertainment, Spain's leading production and distribution company specialising in youth programming, was moving into the live action arena with a brand new live action version of the animated hit series, "Lola & Virginia" which is being co-produced with Brave Films. The show is produced in partnership and in joint ownership with RAI cinema, and is pre-sold to Nickelodeon for Spain, Portugal and Italy.

Video game
In 2008, a self-titled video game was released for the Nintendo DS by Virgin Play under their publishing brand V.2 Play. The gameplay consists of the player (Lola) completing a series of tasks, included with some mini-games.

References

External links
 
 At Imira Entertainment's official site

2000s animated television series
2000s high school television series
2006 Spanish television series debuts
2006 Spanish television series endings
Spanish children's animated comedy television series
Spanish flash animated television series
Fictional rivalries